The mission statement of the South Asian Women's Creative Collective (SAWCC) states: "SAWCC has served South Asian women since 1997 and has earned a reputation for showcasing cutting-edge work that deals intelligently with issues of gender and cultural representation. It is a nonprofit arts organization dedicated to the advancement, visibility, and development of emerging and established South Asian women artists and creative professionals by providing a physical and virtual space to profile their creative and intellectual work across disciplines." SAWCC has no membership dues and is entirely volunteer-driven.

History 
The South Asian Women’s Creative Collective (SAWCC) was founded by the artist Jaishri Abichandani in New York City in 1997. SAWCC held its first meeting in March at the offices of the Sister Fund in Manhattan. Fourteen South Asian women of diverse ages and sexuality attended that meeting, including members from Sakhi for South Asian Women and the South Asian Lesbian and Gay Association.  Soon after, women began to gather monthly at the Asian American Writers’ Workshop to facilitate and present their work. At that time, there were no other (feminist or otherwise) South Asian arts–based organizations in New York, making SAWCC an eclectic and unique space of support and community. Their public event was a festival for women of color at the Audre Lorde Project in Fort Greene, Brooklyn. This was followed by SAWCC’s first annual festival of visual art and performance, Karmakollage, which took place at the Gallery at 678 to an audience of over 400 people.

Sisterhood plays a significant role in the creation of the collective, alongside a  particularly South Asian brand of feminism and camaraderie. SAWCC supports emerging artists, writers and creative professionals, while simultaneously finding support from noted artists like Shazia Sikander, writer Jhumpa Lahiri and filmmaker Mira Nair who donated an advance screening of ‘Monsoon Wedding’ to raise funds for SAWCC. Many founding board members, such as Prerena Reddy were also heavily invested in the arts, and brought those skill sets to SAWCC. Prerana and has been quoted as saying: “basically we feel South Asian women have not had a space in the mainstream art world and our aim is to develop artists work and give them a space for exhibitions where curators can see it.  We want to show there’s a high level of work and we always seek curators that are well-known.” 

Within a year and a half a volunteer board emerged, and SAWCC applied for nonprofit status and became incorporated. In February 2000, they set up an online list for South Asian women artists and creative professionals, which includes over 500 members. Their writing workshop Brown Eyed Girls was initiated in 2002, and a studio circle for visual artists began in 2006. After that, SAWCC continues to hold public events such as annual visual arts exhibition, performances, film screenings, talks, and literary events. All of these have given visibility to emerge and establish women artists, writers, and academics, connecting industry professionals to women who would otherwise not have access to these resources. By 2012, SAWCC had reached an annual audience of over 5,000 for their events. From its inception as a small artists’ community to its current status as a nationally-recognized feminist nonprofit, SAWCC offers a phenomenal venue for South Asian women to connect through creative practice.

SAWCC has drawn inspiration from other activist groups such as the Black Arts Movement in the UK, as well as the progressive South Asian arts festival Desh Pardesh in Toronto. According to the founder Abichandani, she emphasizes:”What has set SAWCC apart from our local peers was our pioneering commitment  to making art, and to date we remain the only exclusively feminist space.” SAWCC’s influence and audience has includes artists, writers and performers, and now with social media, the membership has expanded exponentially, for example, SAWCC's Facebook group has over 6000 members.

Within a US context, for new immigrants, it is still a way to find one’s bearings in New York City. Josheen Oberoi, a specialist in South Asian art with the auction house Saffronart, recalls, ”When I first came to New York, it was such a comfort to find an intellectual space that allowed interaction with South Asian women who were practitioners of art, in one form or the other.  I realized that SAWCC- pronounced saucy- was the perfectly appropriate pronunciation for this community of women where each meeting was an honest exchange of ideas, debates – absolute firecrackers of discussions and where each diverse voice was heard.” 

Generally speaking, SAWCC provides women of South Asian descent with links to various communities and encourages their growth as artists by providing a venue to exchange ideas and feedback on their creative work and network with other South Asian women artists, educators, community workers, and professionals.

SAWCC Programming 
SAWCC holds monthly events presenting the work of South Asian women artists including a writing workshop called Brown Eyed Girls, Practice/Process/Portfolio, a studio circle for visual artists, a listserv for South Asian women and annual exhibitions and festivals open to the public.

SAWCC’s programming efforts include: an annual visual arts exhibition, which has included artists such as Chitra Ganesh, Swati Khurana, and Sa’dia Rehman; an annual literary festival which has featured writers including Minal Hajratwala, V.V. Ganeshananthan, and Pulitzer Prize–winning novelist Jhumpa Lahiri; a writing workshop, Brown Eyed Girls, a studio circle of visual artists; and a series of monthly panel discussions and events featuring emerging artists. While serving as a space for South Asian women artists to showcase their work, identify resources, and seek support, SAWCC has become known for presenting cutting-edge work that engages with themes of gender and cultural representation which has collaborated with other arts organizations including 3rd I South Asian Independent Film, the Asian American Writers’ Workshop as well as Pratt Institute.

Annual Visual Arts Exhibition (Select) 
In 2007, an art exhibition in New York presented  by SAWCC which was appropriately enough called (un)Suitable Girls – celebrating young women who wouldn’t have the arranged marriages and dowries like their mothers; the messy outspoken girls who might horrify prospective in-laws with their bitchiness and their wanton western ways. It’s about anger and angst, about questioning society’s iron-clad rules.

2012 was SAWCC's 15th-year retrospective visual arts show which received critical acclaim, including a glowing piece in The New York Times.

Brown Eyed Girls 
Brown Eyed Girls was SAWCC’s writing workshop, which met regularly from 2002-2006. BEG was created in response to the needs of the SAWCC’s literary membership for a structured space within which to workshop pieces and receive critical feedback.

Studio Circle 
SAWCC’s studio circle for practicing visual artists was initiated in 2006 and consists of women of South Asian and Iranian heritage. This group met regularly from 2006-2013 at the studio of a different artist to critique work and provide space for collaborations and networking, as studio critiques provide a deeper way to meet the needs of practicing visual artists.

SAWCC London 
SAWCC is based in the New York City area and has a sister chapter in London. SAWCC London offers free women-only “monthlies,” as well as open public events. SAWCC London monthlies provide a platform for women artists of South Asian descent to actively network—and to share, discuss, and develop creative ideas and works. Since 2004, SAWCC London has nurtured independently-forged British South Asian female creative expression. It has developed into a respected network with a reputation for showcasing cutting-edge creativity embracing gender, identity, and cultural representation.

Members 
Over the years, hundreds of women have been members of SAWCC and been included in SAWCC programming, including artists, writers, and curators: Jaishri Abichandani, Swati Khurana, Chitra Ganesh, Prerana Reddy, Sa’dia Rehman, Dj Rekha, Yamini Nayar, Shahzia Sikander, Senain Khesghi, V.V. Ganeshananthan, Yashica Dutt, Sarita Khurana, Jasmine Wahi, and Monica Jahan Bose.

References 

Organizations established in 1997
Asian-American organizations
Organizations based in New York City